Sarcodon portoricensis is a species of tooth fungus in the family Bankeraceae. Found in Puerto Rico, where it grows on clay soils of low-elevation wet forests, it was described as new to science in 2015.

References

External links

Fungi described in 2015
Fungi of the Caribbean
portoricensis